Crusade in Europe is a computer wargame published by MicroProse in 1985 for the Apple II, Atari 8-bit family, Commodore 64, and MS-DOS. It was designed by Sid Meier and Ed Bever.

Gameplay
Crusade in Europe is a game in which its five available major operations include Normandy, Race for the Rhine, Market Garden, Bulge and the Campaign Scenario.

Reception
M. Evan Brooks reviewed the game for Computer Gaming World, and stated that "CIE offers five scenarios in one package, a bargain."

Reviews
Zzap! - Nov, 1985
Computer Gamer #8 (1985-11)
Computer Gaming World - Nov, 1991

References

External links
Review in Antic
Review in Commodore Power/Play
Review in ANALOG Computing
Review in Family Computing
Review in Commodore User
Article in Video Games & Computer Entertainment
Article in Tilt (French)

1985 video games
Apple II games
Atari 8-bit family games
Commodore 64 games
Computer wargames
DOS games
MicroProse games
Turn-based strategy video games
Video games about Nazi Germany
Video games developed in the United States
Video games set in France
Video games set in Germany
Video games set in the Netherlands
Works about Operation Overlord
World War II video games